Lon Oden (March 15, 1863 – August 10, 1910) was a Texas Ranger of the Old West, and is a legend inside the Texas Rangers organization.

Early life
He was born Alonzo Van Oden and called "Lon", in Tilden, Texas, in McMullen County. At the time, Tilden was called Dogtown, and previously it had been called Rio Frio, because it is located on the Frio River. It was later changed to the name Colfax, but eventually settled on the name of Tilden, after Samuel Tilden, a presidential candidate.

His father, Aaron Van Buren Oden, of Swedish descent, had served several times as a Texas Ranger before fathering Lon Oden. Four months after Lon Oden's birth, Aaron Oden, accompanied by rancher George Hindes, encountered Julian Gonzales, a noted horse thief from Starr County, Texas. They came into contact with him between the towns of Presidio and Los Ojuelos, on the Rio Grande. In the ensuing gunfight that followed, Aaron Oden killed Gonzales, but was shot and killed by Gonzales. Hindes, lacking proper tools, buried Aaron Oden where he died, then had the task of informing Aaron's 19-year-old wife, Mary Jane Walker Oden, of her husband's death. Mary Jane Oden was now left to raise their son with no father.

Lon Oden's grandfather, Mary Jane Oden's father, Joe Walker, had initially raised his family in Shelby County, Texas, but was forced to leave after he killed two men during the Regulator-Moderator War. They eventually settled in Atascosa County, where they became some of its earliest settlers. It was there that Mary Jane Walker married Aaron Van Oden. Mary Jane Oden, however, did not last long after her husband's death. She died on August 31, 1864, only a year after her husband. Her father Joe recorded in his journal that she died of a broken heart, out of grief.

This left Lon Oden to be raised by his grandparents, and both the Walker family and the Oden family shared in this task. His grandmother Oden taught him the classics of Sweden. She also educated him in poetry and the arts. From the Walker side, he learned the arts of shooting, and the skills necessary to survive in a harsh land. His grandfather, Joe Walker, had a total of nineteen children, but due to the circumstances surrounding Lon Oden's becoming an orphan at the age of 1 year, Joe Walker took special interest in the child and his upbringing. When Lon was only 2 years old, Joseph Walker gave him 150 head of cattle, registering them with the "ODN" brand.

Lon Oden's uncles, Tom and James, were but teenagers when their sister died. Coming from the Walker family, which was noted for being rugged and tough, they were outdoorsmen, cowboys, and from the enormous amount of time he spent with them, Lon Oden learned the trade of cattle, and how to work them and wrangle them. During this time, he often saw his family battle against raiding Comanche, who would raid the ranch for horse or cattle. On Christmas Eve, 1868, his cousin William "Buck" Taylor was gunned down and killed, in a shooting which many attribute to have been the start of the Sutton–Taylor feud The Walker family was tied to the Taylor's due to James Walker having married Sophronia Taylor, the widow of Martin Taylor. Lon Oden's uncle Tom Walker became a somewhat well known gunman, who had several brushes with the law due to shootings he was involved in. He eventually drifted to Seven Rivers, New Mexico, and took part in the Lincoln County War as a member of the Seven Rivers Warriors gang. He was killed in a gunfight on November 23, 1879. This was the life and family in which Lon Oden was raised.

Texas Ranger career
Lon Oden married for the first time in 1889, but the marriage ended shortly in divorce, and on March 1, 1891, he joined the Texas Rangers. For a time he worked the region surrounding San Antonio, but then was sent west to serve with Ranger John R. Hughes. Oden and Hughes were dispatched to Shafter, due to the Carrasco brothers gang, led by Antonio Carrasco, committing armed robberies in order to steal silver being shipped from the silver mines. Assisted by Ranger and undercover agent Ernest St. Leon, the Rangers set up surveillance on a mine where the thieves were expected to strike, based on inside information gained by St. Leon. When the outlaws opened fire after ignoring the command to surrender, the Rangers killed all three men.

Oden then was sent to El Paso, where he worked for some time, and where he became acquainted with, and friends with Ranger Bass Outlaw. In 1893, when Ranger Captain Frank Jones was ambushed and killed, John Hughes took over as Ranger Captain for that area. Because Jones and his small band of Rangers were mistakenly inside Mexico when the ambush had taken place, there was to be no prosecution of those responsible. However, still working undercover, Ernest St. Leon supplied a list of names of those known to have taken part in the killing to Captain Jones. Accompanied by a company of Rangers, including Oden and led by Hughes, the Rangers tracked down and killed all 18 men on the list, either by shooting them or by hanging them.

Oden had by this time settled in Ysleta, Texas. During this time he took part in several Ranger raids, and over time he and his fellow Rangers working that area drastically reduced the number of robberies and cattle rustling in that region. On April 5, 1894, Bass Outlaw was shot and killed by John Selman in El Paso. Outlaw was not innocent in his own death, a fact which made it all the more difficult to accept for Oden. Outlaw, intoxicated and furious at what he deemed mistreatment by a local judge, had shot and killed Ranger Joe McKidrict inside a brothel. When confronted by Selman, a constable at the time, Outlaw and Selman became involved in a gunfight, leaving Selman wounded, and Outlaw dead. Two years later, on April 5, 1896, lawman and friend to Outlaw, George Scarborough, would shoot and kill Selman in a gunfight over Selman having killed Outlaw.

Lon Oden continued working as a Ranger, and by this time he had developed a considerable reputation due to the numerous and mostly unknown outlaws and cattle rustlers he had either killed in shootouts, arrested, or hanged. He had become involved with widow Annie Laura Hay around 1894. On January 17, 1897, the couple married, and he left the Rangers shortly thereafter to become a rancher and businessman. He started a successful ranch in Marfa, Texas. He died there of an unknown lung ailment on August 11, 1910. In 1936, his daughter Annie Laura Oden Jensen published his diary of his exploits as a Ranger.

Notes

External links
Ranger Dispatch
Truth Behind the Photo

1863 births
1910 deaths
Lawmen of the American Old West
Members of the Texas Ranger Division
People from McMullen County, Texas
Cowboys
People from Marfa, Texas